Kirby Park railway station was a station on the single track Hooton to West Kirby branch of the Birkenhead Railway, on the Wirral Peninsula, England.

History
The Birkenhead Railway, owned jointly by the Great Western Railway (GWR) and London and North Western Railway (LNWR), had initially opened a branch line from Hooton to Parkgate in 1866. An extension to West Kirby was completed twenty years later although Kirby Park station did not open until 1 October 1894. It was named after Kirby Park, the area surrounding the house Kirbymount, formerly the summer residence of John Hurleston Leche XV of Carden.

Originally considered an experimental station, it was constructed primarily of timber  to the south of the current West Kirby railway station and served largely as a school stop for the nearby Calday Grange Grammar School.

Closure
Kirby Park railway station closed before most of the stations on the line on 5 July 1954, however for school purposes it remained open until 1956. The track continued to be used for freight transportation and driver training for another six years, closing on 7 May 1962. The line was lifted two years later with the station building and platform completely demolished. The only evidence that a station stood on this site is the entrance on Sandy Lane in West Kirby.

Wirral Country Park
The route became the Wirral Way footpath and part of Wirral Country Park in 1973, which was the first such designated site in Britain.

References

Further reading

External links

Disused railway stations in the Metropolitan Borough of Wirral
Former Birkenhead Railway stations
Railway stations in Great Britain opened in 1894
Railway stations in Great Britain closed in 1954